Fabienne Tomasini (born 14 July 1997) is an Austrian handballer for LC Brühl Handball and the Austrian national team.

She represented Austria at the 2021 World Women's Handball Championship, placing 16th.

References

1997 births
Living people
Austrian female handball players
People from Lustenau
Sportspeople from Vorarlberg